Michel Rubini (born December 3, 1942) is an American musician, conductor, arranger, producer, songwriter and composer. A professional classical pianist since early childhood, he was a prolific session musician of the 1960s and '70s, part of a group known as "The Wrecking Crew", and worked with such artists Ray Charles, Frank Zappa, Sonny and Cher and Barbra Streisand. He has also written several film scores, notably for Tony Scott's The Hunger (1983) and Michael Mann's Manhunter (1986), and the television series Capitol (1982-87) and The Hitchhiker (1984-87).

As a musician
As a session player and arranger
Rubini was producer, conductor and arranger for Motown Records. He was one of the most sought-after Los Angeles session players during the 1960s and 1970s, performing on albums by Sonny & Cher (and the hit single "The Beat Goes On"), Loggins and Messina, Michael Parks, the Cats, the Righteous Brothers, and many others. Rubini arranged and conducted Sonny & Chér single "A Cowboy's Work Is Never Done", arranged Cher single "Don't Hide Your Love" and Maureen McGovern single "I Won't Last A Day Without You". Rubini also made numerous television appearances in the house band of the 1980s game shows Face the Music and Name That Tune. Rubini played the organ on "That's Life" by Frank Sinatra and the grand piano on "Strangers in the Night", also by Sinatra.

As a writer
Rubini co-wrote three songs for Thelma Houston: "Give Me Something To Believe In", "Memories", and "I've Got The Devil In Me" - all included in The Devil in Me album. He composed two songs for The New Kids film: "Edge Of Survival" (lyrics and performed by Jess Harnell) and "Over And Over And Over Again" (lyrics and performed by Miriam Cutler).
Solo Career
Rubini, together with Don Dunn, wrote and recorded an album Diggin' It in 1976. During recording session, he played on piano, organ, clavinet, harpsichord, electric piano, and synthesizer. In 1978 a follow-up of sorts was issued under the Motown imprint, this one by Friendly Enemies, a pop trio consisting of Dunn, Rubini, and lead vocalist Chuck Smith. The album Round One also bore the original version of "Baby It's Me", which was recorded by Diana Ross in 1977 (the Enemies' version was made that year, but remained in the can until the 1978 LP release.) In 1988 he recorded his LP album for Gold Castle Records called Secret Dreams. The album was re-recorded, mixed and released on CD by Essence Records in 1994. Rubini recalled:
He started playing gospel and blues about age 13, but he wrote, recorded and released his first and, so far, only blues album Band is Tight Tonite in early 1990s. Rubini had said:
Rubini also wrote two instrumental songs, released as a single by Atco, called Summer Song /Moonlight Mood.

As a film score composer
Rubini’s most famous score may be as the composer of the soundtrack to The Hunger, a horror film directed by Tony Scott. This 1983 score is a good example of very dark 1980s electronic music (created using synthesizers and synclavier II) inspired by the work of Krzysztof Penderecki and György Ligeti. In 1985 he composed Graham's Theme for Michael Mann's film Manhunter. (The film itself was shot and released a year later.) The theme composed by Rubini for Manhunter was also dark, but it was more melodic than the score to The Hunger. Rubini collaborated with Mann a second time, for Band of the Hand. This film, produced by Mann and directed by Paul Michael Glaser, contains more traditional music by Rubini, recorded by him using a shakuhachi. In 1992 Rubini composed the score for to Nemesis, an independent sci-fi action-thriller directed by Albert Pyun. The Nemesis score was a jazz and oriental music fusion with an electronic ensemble. His instrumental music is in the films Panic ("HSML Cha Cha Cha #1", "HSML Bossa Nova Source #1") and Hollywood Homicide  ("Lord Made An Angel"). He composed two songs for The New Kids film: Edge Of Survival (lyrics written and performed by Jess Harnell) and Over And Over And Over Again (lyrics written and performed by Miriam Cutler).
In 1992 he wrote and performed music for the Merlin & The Dragons audiobook  by Jane Yolen (read by Kevin Kline).

As a television score composer
Rubini's first television work was as pianist for the Tommy Oliver Orchestra on the 1980 musical game show Face the Music, where he was frequently referred to on-air by host Ron Ely and occasionally performed solo pieces. This was followed by composing the score for the TV series The Hitchhiker in 1983, along with co-scoring the daytime soap opera Capitol and the HBO series Tales from the Crypt. Since 1987, he became successful as a mini-series, HBO special and TV movie composer.

In June 2008, as a member of the Wrecking Crew, a legendary group of studio musicians responsible for backing most of the hits recorded in Los Angeles during the 60’s, Rubini was named on a Plaque with other key players in the group in a ceremony at the Guitar Center WALK OF FAME in Hollywood.

Discography
Summer Song /Moonlight Mood (Single)
Diggin it '76 (with Don Dunn)
Round One (with Don Dunn and Chuck Smith as "Friendly Enemies") 1978
Secret Dreams
Band is Tight Tonite

Soundtracks released
The Hunger (with Danny Jaeger, Howard Blake, and Bauhaus)
Manhunter (with The Reds, The Prime Movers, Shriekback, Kitarō, and Red 7)
Band of the Hand (with Bob Dylan)
Merlin and the Dragons (audiobook, with Kevin Kline)
Nemesis

References

External links
 
 Michel Rubini - Profile and photographs of the co-composer of the music for Manhunter
 Michel Rubini - Profile of the composer of the music for Hitchhiker

Living people
1942 births
Musicians from Los Angeles
American film score composers
American television composers
American male film score composers
The Wrecking Crew (music) members
American classical pianists
Male classical pianists
American session musicians
American rock keyboardists
American rock pianists
American male pianists
American male conductors (music)
20th-century American pianists
Classical musicians from California
20th-century American conductors (music)
21st-century American conductors (music)
21st-century classical pianists
20th-century American male musicians
21st-century American male musicians
21st-century American pianists